Lt. Colonel Sardar Gurcharan Singh Grewal (May 4, 1911 – February 7, 1949) was an Indian field hockey player who competed in the 1936 Summer Olympics.

In 1936 he was a member of the Indian field hockey team, which won the gold medal. He played one match as back.

References
 Indian Express, Feb 11, 1949, p.7
 Sports Reference

External links

1911 births
1949 deaths
Field hockey players from Punjab, India
Olympic field hockey players of India
Field hockey players at the 1936 Summer Olympics
Indian male field hockey players
Olympic gold medalists for India
Olympic medalists in field hockey
Medalists at the 1936 Summer Olympics